The New Disciple is a 1921 American silent film directed by Ollie Sellers and produced by labor organization the Federal Film Corporation in Seattle, Washington. It was the most widely viewed labor film of this period, with over one million viewers in the year of its release. The film featured Alfred Allen, Norris Johnson, and Pell Trenton. The silent film included titles from Woodrow Wilson's 1913 New Freedom and told the story of a war veteran and a corrupt capitalist war profiteer. Ollie Sellers directed the anti-open shop film which was an indictment of the American plan.  Promotions for the film called for union members to "wait" on their film exchanges to show the film. Film production was supervised by John Arthur Nelson who wrote the story which was published at the same time. William Piggott wrote the screenplay.  The film was made in Los Angeles.

Cast
Pell Trenton
Margaret Mann
Alfred Allen
Norris Johnson
Walt Whitman
Arthur Hall

References 

1921 films
American silent feature films
American black-and-white films
Films directed by Oliver L. Sellers
1920s American films